Jenkins may refer to:

People
 Jenkins (name), history of the surname
 List of people with surname Jenkins
 The Jenkins, country music group

Places

United States
Jenkins, Illinois
Jenkins, Kentucky
Jenkins, Minnesota
Jenkins, Missouri
Jenkins County, Georgia
Jenkins Township, Crow Wing County, Minnesota
Jenkins Township, Luzerne County, Pennsylvania

Other
Jenkins (crater), on the Moon and VA

Politics and history
Jenkins Commission (UK), an English voting reform commission
Jenkins Commission (EU), a European monetary commission
War of Jenkins' Ear, a colonial war between Britain and Spain

Software
Jenkins (software), a continuous integration tool
Jenkins hash function

Other
Jenkins activity survey, a psychological assessment tool
Jenkins (drinking game)
"Jenkins" (How I Met Your Mother), a television episode
Leeroy Jenkins, an Internet meme related to World of Warcraft

See also
Hundred of Jenkins, a region in South Australia
Jenkin
Jenkyns
Justice Jenkins (disambiguation)
Jenkins Group, a publishing company